Kimberley Chambers may refer to:
 Kim Chambers (born 1974), American pornographic actress
 Kim Chambers, New Zealand swimmer
 Kimberley Chambers (born 1967), British novelist